The World Freefall Convention celebrates the extreme sport of skydiving.  The first convention was in 1990, in Quincy, Illinois, and it continued there through 2001.  From 2002 to 2006 it was held in Rantoul, Illinois. The event includes various other sports too, such as sky surfing, raft jumping and even naked jumps. The event was canceled in 2007 and 2008 due to personal reasons by the founder and has not been scheduled or held since.

Statistics 
In 1999 the convention drew 5,410 registrations, people from all 50 states and 52 different countries were included.  During a 10-day period there were over 65,000 jumps made.  Also there were 503 tandem jumps made, 84 AFS students passed, 393 kegs were given away and $30,855 was raised for various charities.

Registration 
Registration was $49 for jumpers, $24 for non jumpers, and included camping, seminars, hot showers, nightly entertainment, and beer.

Jumping Packages and Costs 
$79 for a single jump out of a hot air balloon
$39 for a single jump out of a helicopter
$170 for a standard ten pack standard jump package
$159 for a tandem jump (for first time jumpers)
$700 for a multi-day AFF school

Qualifications 
If you want to jump you will need a type "B" license or equivalent which is proof that you took the basic skydiving training and completed at least 50 jumps.  You will also need a USPA membership or equivalent foreign membership, which you can buy there for $8.

External links
World Free Fall Convention website
Festivals and Events at camels.com
Who killed the Magic of Quincy?, skyXtreme, Vol. 19, August/September 2001.
Wurth, Julie. "Death Arrives at Free-Fall Fest", The News-Gazette, August 4, 2002, retrieved 2019-03-09 

Quincy–Hannibal area